Dmitry Strykov (born September 13, 1982) is an Uzbekistani sprint canoer who competed in the mid-2000s. He was eliminated in the semifinals of the K-4 1000 m event at the 2004 Summer Olympics in Athens.

External links
Sports-Reference.com profile

1982 births
Canoeists at the 2004 Summer Olympics
Living people
Olympic canoeists of Uzbekistan
Uzbekistani male canoeists
Asian Games medalists in canoeing
Canoeists at the 2002 Asian Games
Medalists at the 2002 Asian Games
Asian Games bronze medalists for Uzbekistan
21st-century Uzbekistani people